Chittajalu Lakshmipati, known mononymously as Lakshmipati, was an Indian actor and writer who predominantly appeared in Telugu films, acting in over 70 of them. He was the elder brother of Sobhan, who directed the film Varsham. He died a few days after his brother's death.

Career
Lakshmipati started as a writer and no time he started hosting shows like the well known sensational show called Huss Gup Chup as Gireesam Master and he worked as writer for Krishna Vamsi's Chandralekha and he is a well known comedian to Telugu film lovers. He was first seen in Chiranjeevi's Choodalani Vundi. He got a break as an actor with EVV's film Allari and he first played a negative role in Mahesh Babu's Bobby, directed by his brother Sobhan. He also played significant roles in Andhrudu, Pedababu and Kithakithalu.

Death
Lakshmipati died of a heart attack on 7 February 2008.

Filmography

 Pelli Peetalu (1998)
 Murari (2001)
 Jayam (2002)
 Allari (2002)
 Nee Sneham (2002)
 Gemeni (2002)
 Bobby (2002)
 Sreeram (2002)
 Thotti Gang (2002)
 Juniors (2003)
 Ammayilu Abbayilu (2003)
 Vijayam (2003)
 Ninne Ishtapaddanu (2003)
 Kalyana Ramudu (2003)
 Charminar (2003)
 Villain (2003)
 Satta (2004)
 Aa Naluguru (2004)
 Pedababu (2004)
 Donga Dongadi (2004)
 Xtra (2004)
 Chanti (2004)
 Sakhiya (2004)
 Evadi Gola Vaadidhi (2005)
 Relax (2005)
 Danger (2005)
 Soggadu (2005)
 Premikulu (2005)
 Nuvvante Naakishtam (2005)
 Andhrudu (2005)
 Adirindayya Chandram (2005)
 Mahanandi (2005)
 Kithakithalu (2006)
 Nee Navvu Chalu (2006)
 Andala Ramudu (2006)
 Annavaram (2006)
 Maharathi (2007)
 Anumanaspadam (2007)
 Lakshmi Kalyanam (2007)
 Athili Sattibabu LKG (2007)
 Viyyalavari Kayyalu (2007)
 Okka Magaadu (2008)
 Hare Ram (2008)
 Mangatayaru Tiffin Centre (2008)
 Sundarakanda (2008)
 Andamaina Manasulo (2008)

References

External links

2008 deaths
Telugu male actors
Indian male film actors
Male actors from Andhra Pradesh
Indian male comedians
Telugu comedians
Male actors in Telugu cinema
21st-century Indian male actors
20th-century Indian male actors
1957 births